Literary adaptation is the adapting of a literary source (e.g. a novel, short story, poem) to another genre or medium, such as a film, stage play, or video game.

It can also involve adapting the same literary work in the same genre or medium just for different purposes, e.g. to work with a smaller cast, in a smaller venue (or on the road), or for a different demographic group (such as adapting a story for children). Sometimes the editing of these works without the approval of the author can lead to a court case.

It also appeals because it works well as a story; it has interesting characters, who say and do interesting things. This is particularly important when adapting to a dramatic work, e.g. film, stage play, teleplay, as dramatic writing is some of the most difficult. To get an original story to function well on all the necessary dimensions—concept, character, story, dialogue, and action—is an extremely rare event performed by a rare talent.

Perhaps most importantly, especially for producers of the screen and stage, an adapted work is more bankable; it represents considerably less risk to investors, and poses the possibilities of huge financial gains. This is because:
 It has already attracted a following.
 It clearly works as a literary piece in appealing to a broad group of people who care.
 Its title, author, characters, etc. may be a franchise in and of themselves already.

Film
Works of literature have been adapted for film from the dawn of the industry. Some of the earliest examples come from the work of Georges Méliès, who pioneered many film techniques. In 1899, he released two adaptations—Cinderella based on the Brothers Grimm story of the same name and King John, the first known film to be based on the works of Shakespeare. The 1900 film Sherlock Holmes Baffled, directed by Arthur Marvin featured Arthur Conan Doyle's detective character Sherlock Holmes intruding upon a pseudo-supernatural burglary. The film, considered the first detective movie, ran for only 30 seconds and was originally intended to be shown in hand-cranked Mutoscope machines.

Méliès' 1902 original science-fiction feature A Trip to the Moon was based loosely on two popular novels of the time: Jules Verne's From the Earth to the Moon (1865) and H. G. Wells' The First Men in the Moon (1901). The first of many adaptations of the Brothers Grimm tale Snow White was released in 1902 while the earliest surviving copy is the 1916 version. 1903 saw the release of Alice in Wonderland directed by Cecil Hepworth and Percy Stow, the first movie adaptation of Lewis Carroll's 1865 children's book Alice's Adventures in Wonderland.

The first feature-length film to be shot entirely in Hollywood was Cecil B. DeMille's first assignment, The Squaw Man, in 1914, which was the first of three movie versions (all directed by DeMille) based on Edwin Milton Royle's 1905 play of the same name. Since the early days of the genre, major films have been largely adapted:
 Novels: Gone With the Wind (1939), From Here to Eternity (1953), and The Godfather (1972) were all adapted from novels of the same name.
 Plays: Casablanca (1942), Streetcar Named Desire (1951), and Equus (1977) were all adapted from stage plays.
 Short stories: The Secret Life of Walter Mitty (1947), Breakfast at Tiffany's (1961), The Heart Is a Lonely Hunter (1968), Shawshank Redemption (1994), and Brokeback Mountain (2005) were all made from short stories.
The most celebrated of the early adaptations is Erich von Stroheim's Greed, a 1924 adaptation of the 1899 novel McTeague by naturalist writer Frank Norris. The director intended to film every aspect of the novel in great detail, resulting in a 9½-hour epic feature. At studio insistence, the film was cut down to two hours and was considered a flop upon its theatrical release. It has since been restored to just over four hours and is considered one of the greatest films ever made. 

One book that has been adapted very frequently (in one form or another) is Charles Dickens' 1843 Christmas story A Christmas Carol, which has around 20 film adaptations to date.

Video game 
Books and plays adapted into video games include The Witcher, based on the fantasy novels and short stories by Polish author Andrzej Sapkowski; Romance of the Three Kingdoms, based on a Chinese 14th-century historical novel; I Have No Mouth, and I Must Scream, based on a short story by Harlan Ellison; and Hamlet, based on the play by William Shakespeare. The horror video game Parasite Eve is a sequel to a novel by the same name.

Process
Plagiarism occurs in every genre, and throughout history, but such literary rights violations can be challenged in court. In the case of Hollywood films, judgments for the plaintiff can run into the millions of dollars, but these have typically been for outright theft of a screenplay idea rather than for fraudulent adaptations (see Buchwald v. Paramount).

Because of the importance of telling a story with a limited number of characters, short stories often make better sources for adaptable material than do novels. For the stage, in addition, theater audiences tend to accept and prefer works of a more conceptual, thought-based nature, meaning their preferences need to be considered when selecting a work for adaptation, but also when determining how best to adapt it. The stage imposes physical limits of size and technology. Not every illusion that can be made to appear real on the movie screen can be made to appear so on stage.

See also
List of public domain works with multimedia adaptations

References

 
Translation studies
Adaptation (arts)